Leontine may refer to:

As a given name
Leontine "Lona" Cohen (1913–1992), American spy for the Soviet Union
Leontine Cooper (1837–1903), Australian trade unionist, suffragist and campaigner for women's rights
Leontine T. Kelly (1920–2012), American bishop
Leontyne Butler King (1905-1974), American businesswoman
Léontine Lippmann (1844–1910), literary muse and salon hostess
Léontine de Maësen (1835–1906), Belgian soprano
Leontien van Moorsel (born 1970), Dutch racing cyclist
Leontyne Price (born 1927), American soprano
Leontine Sagan (1889–1974), Austrian actress

As a middle name
Florence Leontine Welch (born 1986) English singer

Other uses
Leontine martyrs, clergy killed in Persia in 455 AD